The 2019 Junior League World Series took place from August 11–18 in Taylor, Michigan. Fullerton, Southern California defeated Guayama, Puerto Rico in the championship game.

Taiwan's JLWS record winning streaks of championships (6), and games (37), were ended by Puerto Rico in the International Championship.

Teams

Results

United States Bracket

International Bracket

Elimination Round

References

Junior League World Series
Junior League World Series
Junior